Petaluma High School is located one mile from historic downtown Petaluma in California. It is a comprehensive public high school with approximately 1,310 students in grades 9–12, serving the west side of Petaluma and many of the rural areas that surround the city in both Sonoma County and Marin County.

Academics
Petaluma High School has a graduation rate of 96.33% as of 2011, with 37.2% of students satisfying the requirements for admission to either the University of California or the California State University system. The average class sizes are 30 for Math, 25 for Science and English, and 30 for Social Science.  Per the Standardized Testing and Reporting (STAR) Program, 66% of students in English, 30% in Math 69% in Science, and 62% in Social Science scored as Proficient or Advanced.  It offers Advanced Placement courses in 15 subjects: English Composition/Literature, Spanish Literature, Calculus A/B, Calculus B/C, Statistics, Biology, Chemistry, Physics, Environmental Science, World History, U.S. History, Macroeconomics, Psychology, American Government, and Art.

The school (along with Casa Grande High School) is set to a “block schedule”, in which there are only three classes (or four, if students choose to take a class before school known as “zero period”) per day.

Facilities
Petaluma High School began as a public school in 1873, making it one of the oldest high schools in California.  Sitting on approximately 24 acres, the current campus was completed in 1935 with the main building remodeled in December 2001. A new science and math building was completed in October 2000. Modernization of the D-Wing building was completed during the summer of 2005.

During the 2009-2010 school-year the new Arts, Media and Entertainment building was opened. The Arts Media and Entertainment program includes education in digital and print photography with a full service laboratory. Students interested in filmmaking partake in the film program, while those interested in drawing, painting, sculpture, ceramics, and other art forms participate in the core Art program that culminates in AP Art.

The entire campus consists of the following: 83 classrooms, a wildlife museum, auto shop, wood shop, metal shop, and an agricultural shop. Athletic facilities include a gymnasium; baseball, football, and softball fields; weight room; and swimming pool.

Staff and administration
The staff at Petaluma High includes 72 certificated teachers, four academic counselors, a Project Success counselor, a full-time librarian, a Safe School Support Specialist, three administrators, and 40 classified support staff members. In addition, it has the part-time services of a school nurse, a school psychologist, a speech and language specialist, bilingual support services, and instructional assistants in special education.

On July 1, 2019, Justin Mori became principal. Mr. Mori has served with distinction as the Principal of Sonoma Valley High School for the past year, where he focused on providing collaborative professional learning opportunities for staff to support relationship building amongst staff and the student body as well as engaging instructional practices. Prior to Sonoma Valley High School, Mr. Mori served as Principal of San Jose Intermediate School in Novato for six years. Prior to that, Mr. Mori served as the Assistant Principal at Terra Linda High School in San Rafael. He started his career at Capistrano Unified School District as a middle school Science teacher. After graduating from Petaluma High School, Mr. Mori was awarded his bachelor's degree in History from the University of California, Santa Barbara, his master's degree in Educational Leadership and Administration from Chapman University, and his Administrative Credential from Sonoma State University.
Erin Dinday and Giovanni Napoli serve as Assistant Principals.

Sexual assault controversy
On June, 2nd 2018, Petaluma High School attracted great controversy when school officials cut the mic  of the Class of 2018 valedictorian, Lulabel Seitz, during her commencement speech, after extensive warning. Seitz had intended to speak out publicly against the high school's treatment of sexual assault victims, including herself, during graduation. Seitz is quoted as saying that she is "disappointed in [the administration]." Seitz went on to say she wasn't surprised with the administrator's actions because "they do this a lot, they make students be quiet." Seitz went on to clarify, saying "I wasn’t going to do it because they kept scaring me and threatening me. But I thought if I don’t stand up for me and the other girls, then who is going to do it? It was just a kind of a moral decision I had to make." During the speech, just as Seitz prepared to discuss sexual assault and how the school administration allegedly refused to recognize her assault, which took place on the high school campus during school hours, the microphone was cut. "The class of 2018 has demonstrated time and time again that we may be a newer generation, but we are not too young to speak up, to dream, and to create change. Which is why, even when some people on this campus, those same..," Seitz said before the sound was cut. At that point, the audience began cheering "let her speak!" Seitz said the school principal, David Stirrat, told her she wouldn't be continuing her speech, to which she replied with a Malcolm X quote: "A man who stands for nothing, will fall for anything." The sentence she intended to say was later released as follows; "Learning on a campus in which some people defend perpetrators of sexual assault and silence their victims — we didn’t let that drag us down."

David Rose, the assistant superintendent for student services at Petaluma City Schools, responded later, "Many of the assertions that Ms. Seitz is making do not match our perspective."

Wildlife Museum
Petaluma High School is the home of the Petaluma Wildlife Museum, one of the few museums in the country that is solely run by students.  Through the Wildlife Museum, students can take classes on Wildlife Management and Museum Management.

The Museum houses over 50 species of insects, reptiles, amphibians, and mammals.  Thousands of people visit the Museum every year where dozens of high school students provide tours and animal education. Each school year, the Museum hosts several high school classes, educating over 100 teens about a variety of wildlife related subjects. Students take rigorous courses in Wildlife and Museum Management to learn about environmental education, wildlife biology, animal husbandry, public speaking, and museum operations and maintenance. Additionally, throughout the school year, student docents are responsible for animal care, museum maintenance, program development and conducting tours.

Over the course of 20 years, the Museum has hosted thousands of school classes and community groups, teaching them about biodiversity, ecosystems, wildlife, animal adaptations and natural history. Tours are conducted by trained high school docents and are developed around California State Science Standards. Grade school tours visit exhibits representing Africa, Asia, and North and South America. Students also explore large  mineral, fossil, and forestry displays. Hundreds of taxidermied and live animals engage children and bring the science lessons alive.

Manufacturing Technology Program
Petaluma High's Manufacturing Technology program is the only NIMS (National Institute for Metalworking Skills) accredited high school program in the state of California. Dan Sunia is the Manufacturing Technology Instructor, and won a 2010 Golden Bell Award from the California School Boards Association in the category of “Partnerships and Collaboratives” for his program “Engineering Design and Apprentice Trades Skills.”

Clubs
Clubs at Petaluma High include the 4th Wall Video Club, California Scholarship Federation (CSF), Chess Club, Drama Club, Circle of Friends, Council of Written Word, Dance Club, Environment Club, Future Farmers of America (FFA), French Club, Future Business Leaders of America (FBLA), a branch of GSA,  HOSA, Interact, Junior Statesman, Latino Club, Magic Club, MEChA Paddle Smashers, PYPC, Street Dance Club, Skills USA, Soul Stealers, and Student Council.

Athletics
Petaluma High School is a Division III school and one of seven members of the Vine Valley Athletic League of the North Coast Section.  Its mascot is the Trojans and its colors are purple and white.  PHS offers boys sports programs in Badminton, Baseball, Basketball, Cross Country, Football, Golf, Soccer, Swimming, Tennis, Track, and Wrestling.  Girls programs include Cross Country, Golf, Soccer, Softball, Swimming, Tennis, Track, and Volleyball.

In 2009, Petaluma High football had one of its most successful seasons in years, finishing the season 12-1 and making it to the North Coast Section Division 2 quarterfinals. However, they lost in the quarterfinals to Eureka High School. Steve Ellison was the coach of Petaluma High football for the previous 31 seasons and retired after the 2009 season. Coach Ellison's overall coaching record at Petaluma High and Sacred Heart of San Francisco was 218-173-7(Wins-Losses-Ties).  Currently, the head football coach is Rick Krist, a physical education teacher and alumnus of the school. In 2011 Petaluma High School's softball team also won the NCS Championship and came back the following year to defend their title but fell one run short in 2012.

In 2015-16, the boys basketball team had one of their most successful seasons since 1992. The team won 19 games under new head coach Scott Behrs,  beating Casa Grande for the first time in 6 years, defeating powerhouse Cardinal Newman, and winning the Sonoma County League Postseason Tournament Championship over league rival Analy in dramatic fashion, 27-26 at Haehl Pavilion At the campus of Santa Rosa Junior College. Behrs is the winning-est coach at Petaluma High School in the last 20 years.

In 2017, the Egg Bowl was brought back to the town of Petaluma. Casa Grande and Petaluma High Schools would play each other in varsity football for the first time since 2011. The game was played on September 16, 2017 @ Casa Grande High school. Petaluma won the game 20-14, stopping a late Casa Grande drive with 40 seconds left.

The following year saw one of the most exciting Egg Bowl's in the history of the rivalry. Casa Grande trailed by 14 points entering the 4th quarter, but managed to come all the way back with 35 seconds left on a 40-yard touchdown pass, and converted a gutsy two-point conversion to win the game 37-36 @ Ellison Field.

Awards
In 1992, Petaluma High was named a California Distinguished School.

Notable alumni
Ben Bostrom -  Superbike, Supermoto, and Supersport Champion
Lloyd Bridges - actor
Richard D. Hearney - Marine Corps 4-Star General, Assistant Commandant of the Marine Corps & Naval Aviator
Biff Hoffman - football player
Duke Iversen -  football player
Brett Johnson - screenwriter
Tom Moore - long time meet director of the Modesto Relays
Alex Navarro - Drummer, Headboard (1996 - 1998, 2001), Senior Editor, Giant Bomb (2010–2021), and Co-Founder, Nextlander (2021–Present)
Bill Pronzini - mystery writer
Winona Ryder -  actress
Konrad Schmidt - catcher for the Arizona Diamondbacks
Virginia Strom-Martin - California State Assemblywoman 1996-2002

References

External links

High schools in Sonoma County, California
Public high schools in California
Petaluma, California
1873 establishments in California